Hibbertia pallidiflora is a species of flowering plant in the family Dilleniaceae and is endemic to south-eastern continental Australia. It is usually a small, dense shrub with hairy branches, egg-shaped to lance-shaped leaves with the narrower end towards the base, and cream-coloured to pale yellow flowers with eight to thirteen stamens joined at the base on one side of two carpels.

Description
Flowering mostly occurs from August to November.

Taxonomy
Hibbertia pallidiflora was first formally described in 1995 by Hellmut R. Toelken in the Journal of the Adelaide Botanic Gardens from specimens he collected near on the southern Yorke Peninsula in 1994.

Distribution and habitat
This hibbertia grows in temporarily flooded areas and in scrub vegetation near the coast and occurs in south-eastern South Australia, including the Yorke and Fleurieu Peninsulas and Kangaroo Island. It is sometimes recorded in south-western Victoria.

See also
List of Hibbertia species

References

pallidiflora
Flora of South Australia
Flora of Victoria (Australia)
Plants described in 1995
Taxa named by Hellmut R. Toelken